Echinodontium is a genus of fungi in the family Echinodontiaceae. The genus was published by American mycologist Job Bicknell Ellis in 1900, who described it thus: "Differs from Hydnum in the thick, woody pileus of Fomes and the teeth beset with spines, as in Mucronophorus and Hymenochaete". The type species, Echinodontium tinctorium, is commonly known as the "indian paint fungus" owing to its traditional use for bodypainting.

Species
Echinodontium ballouii (Banker) H.L.Gross (1964) – New Jersey (USA)
Echinodontium japonicum  Imazeki (1935) – Japan
Echinodontium ryvardenii  Bernicchia & Piga (1998) – Italy
Echinodontium tinctorium  (Ellis & Everh.) Ellis & Everh. (1900) – western North America
Echinodontium tsugicola  (Henn. & Shirai) Imazeki (1935) – Japan

References

=

Russulales
Russulales genera